Sands of Oblivion is a 2007 Sci-Fi Channel original movie starring Morena Baccarin, Adam Baldwin, Victor Webster, George Kennedy, Richard Kind and Dan Castellaneta. It was directed by David Flores and premiered July 28, 2007 on the Sci Fi Channel.

Synopsis
The film tells the story of a prop from Cecil B. DeMille's 1923 film The Ten Commandments that was actually an authentic artifact from antiquity with cursed powers. In the modern day it resurfaces, leading to murder and mayhem.

Cast 
Morena Baccarin as Alice Carter
Adam Baldwin as Jesse Carter
Victor Webster as Mark Tevis
George Kennedy as John Tevis
Azie Tesfai as Jamie
Richard Kind as Ira Finkelstein
John Aniston as Nigel Barrington
Dan Castellaneta as Cecil B. DeMille
Raymond O'Connor as Dale

Legacy

Sands of Oblivion was featured in the 2016 documentary, The Lost City of Cecil B. DeMille, about the actual efforts to excavate the set of The Ten Commandments.

References

External links 

Syfy original films
2007 television films
2007 films
2007 fantasy films
Films about archaeology
Films about films
Films about veterans
Films set in ancient Egypt
Films set in 1923
Films set in California
Films directed by David Flores
2000s American films